Jimmy Butler III (born September 14, 1989) is an American professional basketball player for the Miami Heat of the National Basketball Association (NBA). Nicknamed "Jimmy Buckets", he is a six-time NBA All-Star, a four-time All-NBA Team honoree, a five-time NBA All-Defensive Team honoree, and an Olympic gold medalist, having won a gold medal in 2016. He played one year of college basketball for Tyler Junior College before transferring to Marquette University.

Butler was drafted with the 30th overall pick in the 2011 NBA draft by the Chicago Bulls. In 2015, he was named the NBA Most Improved Player. After six seasons in Chicago, he was traded to the Minnesota Timberwolves in June 2017. Butler was again traded in November 2018, this time to the Philadelphia 76ers. In July 2019, he signed with the Heat. During his first season with the team, Butler reached the NBA Finals. In 2021, he led the league in steals.

Early life
Butler was born in Houston on September 14, 1989. His father abandoned the family when Butler was an infant. By the time he was 13 years old and living in the Houston suburb of Tomball, his mother kicked him out of the house. As Butler remembered it in a 2011 interview, she told him, "I don't like the look of you. You gotta go." He then bounced between the homes of various friends, staying for a few weeks at a time before moving to another house. Despite all of this, Butler maintains a close relationship with his parents, saying, "I don't hold grudges. I still talk to my family. My mom. My father. We love each other. That's never going to change."

In a summer basketball league before his senior year at Tomball High School, he was noticed by Jordan Leslie, a freshman football and basketball player at the school, who challenged him to a three-point shooting contest. The two immediately became friends, and Butler began staying at Leslie's house. Although his friend's mother and stepfather, who had six other children between them, were reluctant at first, they took him in within a few months. Butler would later say, "They accepted me into their family. And it wasn't because of basketball. She [Michelle Lambert, Leslie's mother] was just very loving. She just did stuff like that. I couldn't believe it."

As a junior at Tomball High, Butler averaged 10 points per game. As a senior and team captain in 2006–07, Butler averaged 19.9 points and 8.7 rebounds per game and was subsequently voted his team's most valuable player.

Butler was not heavily recruited coming out of high school and chose to attend Tyler Junior College in Tyler, Texas.

College career
After his freshman season at Tyler, where he had averaged 18.1 points, 7.7 rebounds, and 3.1 assists per game, Butler drew interest from Division I programs. Considered a two-star recruit by 247Sports.com, he was listed as the No. 127 junior college prospect in 2008.

Butler accepted an athletic scholarship to attend Marquette, where, as a sophomore in the 2008–09 season, he averaged 5.6 points and 3.9 rebounds per game and recorded a free-throw percentage of 76.8%. He moved into the starting lineup as a junior during the 2009–10 campaign to average 14.7 points and 6.4 rebounds per game, and he earned All-Big East Honorable Mention honors. His season was highlighted by two game-winning shots versus UConn and St. John's, to help Marquette finish 11–7 in the Big East and earn its fifth consecutive NCAA tournament appearance. As a senior in 2010–11, he averaged 15.7 points per game and earned an All-Big East Honorable Mention for the second straight year.

Professional career

Chicago Bulls (2011–2017)

2011–2014: Early years and first All-Defensive selection
Butler was selected with the 30th overall pick in the 2011 NBA draft by the Chicago Bulls. He saw limited opportunities in his rookie year, playing 42 games during the lockout-shortened 2011–12 season. The following season, he played all 82 games for the Bulls. After playing limited minutes to begin the 2012–13 season, he saw significant minutes over the second half of the season, including starting all 12 playoff games. He scored a then career-high 28 points against the Toronto Raptors on April 9. Two days later, he recorded his first NBA double-double game with 22 points and a then career-high 14 rebounds against the New York Knicks.

The 2013–14 season saw Butler miss 15 games due to injury, limiting him to 67 games. He averaged a career-high 38.7 minutes per game, which ranked first in the NBA. He scored a season-high 26 points against the Memphis Grizzlies on December 30. He set a franchise record when he played 60:20 in a triple-overtime game against the Orlando Magic on January 15 and finished with 21 points, seven rebounds and six assists. At the season's end, he was named to the NBA All-Defensive Second Team.

2014–2016: Most Improved Player and first All-Star selections

On November 25, 2014, Butler tied a career high with 32 points in a loss to the Denver Nuggets. On December 3, 2014, he was named the Eastern Conference Player of the Month for games played in October/November. He later set a new career high of 35 points in a 103–97 win over the New York Knicks on December 18. On January 29, 2015, Butler was named a reserve for the Eastern Conference in the 2015 NBA All-Star Game. On March 2, 2015, he was ruled out for three to six weeks with a left elbow injury. He returned to action on March 23 against the Charlotte Hornets, recording 19 points and 9 rebounds in a 98–86 win.

On April 20, Butler set a playoff career high for the second straight game, scoring 31 points in the Bulls' 91–82 win over the Milwaukee Bucks to take a 2–0 lead in their first-round series. On April 25, Butler again set a playoff career high with 33 points, in a Bulls' 92–90 loss to the Bucks, cutting their series lead to 3–2. They went on to win Game 6 of the series, moving them onto the semi-finals where they lost 4–2 to the Cleveland Cavaliers. On May 7, he was named the 2014–15 NBA Most Improved Player and became the first player in franchise history to win the award.

On July 9, 2015, Butler re-signed with the Bulls to a five-year, $95 million contract. The deal included a player option for the fifth year. On December 9, he scored a then career-high 36 points in a loss to the Boston Celtics. He topped that mark with 43 points on December 18 in a 147–144 quadruple overtime loss to the Detroit Pistons. On January 3, Butler broke Michael Jordan's team record for points in a half, scoring 40 of his 42 after the break to lead the Bulls to a 115–113 win over the Toronto Raptors. Two days later, he recorded 32 points and a then season-high 10 assists in a 117–106 win over the Milwaukee Bucks. On January 14, he scored a career-high 53 points in a 115–111 overtime win over the Philadelphia 76ers. Butler also had 10 rebounds and six assists while making 15-of-30 field goals and 21-of-25 free throws to help the Bulls snap a three-game losing streak. He became the first Bulls player to score 50 points since Jamal Crawford in 2004. On February 5, Butler suffered a left knee strain in a game against the Denver Nuggets and missed nearly four weeks. He was voted to play in the 2016 NBA All-Star Game, but the injury forced him to drop out, and he was subsequently replaced in the East team by teammate Pau Gasol. Butler missed 11 games with the knee injury, returning to action for the Bulls on March 5 against the Houston Rockets. In 34 minutes of action, he recorded 24 points, 11 rebounds, 6 assists and 1 steal in a 108–100 win, helping the Bulls snap a four-game losing streak. However, he returned to the sidelines on March 7 for the team's game against the Milwaukee Bucks due to back soreness and swelling in his left knee. After a three-game absence, he returned to action on March 14 against the Toronto Raptors. On April 2, he recorded his first career triple-double with 28 points and career highs of 17 rebounds and 12 assists in a 94–90 loss to the Detroit Pistons. In the Bulls' season finale on April 13, Butler recorded his second career triple-double with 10 points, 12 rebounds and 10 assists in a 115–105 win over the Philadelphia 76ers.

2016–2017: First All-NBA selection

In the Bulls' season opener on October 27, Butler scored a team-high 24 points in a 105–99 win over the Boston Celtics. On November 9, he had a 39-point effort in a 115–107 loss to the Atlanta Hawks. Three days later, he scored 37 points, hit all 14 free throws, grabbed eight rebounds and dished out a season-high nine assists in a 106–95 win over the Washington Wizards. On November 20, he scored a season-high 40 points in a 118–110 win over the Los Angeles Lakers. The following day, he was named Eastern Conference Player of the Week for games played Monday, November 14 through Sunday, November 20. On December 28, he matched his season high with 40 points and hit a 20-footer at the buzzer to give the Bulls a 101–99 comeback victory over the Brooklyn Nets. Butler scored nine points in the final 2 minutes to rally Chicago. He finished 11 for 11 from the free-throw line and grabbed 11 rebounds as the Bulls overcame a seven-point deficit in the final three minutes.

On January 2, 2017, Butler scored 52 points in a 118–111 win over the Charlotte Hornets. He was a point shy of his career high, which he got on January 14, 2016, and scored 20 points in the first half and 17 in the game's final four minutes. He also had 12 rebounds and six assists while shooting 21-of-22 from the free-throw line. On January 7, he hit the 40-point mark for the third time in six games, finishing with 42 points in a 123–118 overtime win over the Toronto Raptors. Two days later, he was named Eastern Conference Player of the Week for games played Monday, January 2 through Sunday, January 8. On January 19, Butler was named a starter on the Eastern Conference All-Star team for the 2017 NBA All-Star Game. After questioning the desire of the team's younger players following a loss to the Atlanta Hawks on January 25, Butler was fined and held out of the starting lineup against the Miami Heat on January 27 as punishment. He subsequently finished with just three points on 1-for-13 shooting. On February 25, 2017, he recorded his third career triple-double with 18 points, 10 rebounds and 10 assists in a 117–99 win over the Cleveland Cavaliers. On March 26, 2017, he had 20 points and a then career-high 14 assists in a 109–94 win over the Milwaukee Bucks. On April 6, 2017, he recorded his fourth career triple-double with 19 points, 10 rebounds and 10 assists in a 102–90 win over the Philadelphia 76ers.

Minnesota Timberwolves (2017–2018)
On June 22, 2017, Butler was traded, along with the rights to Justin Patton (the 16th pick in the 2017 NBA draft), to the Minnesota Timberwolves in exchange for Zach LaVine, Kris Dunn and the rights to Lauri Markkanen (the seventh pick in the 2017 NBA draft). In his debut for the Timberwolves in their season opener on October 18, Butler scored 12 points in a 107–99 loss to the San Antonio Spurs. On December 3, he scored 20 of his 33 points in the fourth quarter of the Timberwolves' 112–106 win over Los Angeles Clippers. On December 12, he scored 38 points in a 118–112 overtime loss to the Philadelphia 76ers. On December 18, he had a 37-point effort in a 108–107 win over the Portland Trail Blazers. On December 27, Butler scored 12 of Minnesota's 14 points in overtime and finished with a season-high 39 to lift the Timberwolves to a 128–125 victory over the Denver Nuggets. On January 23, he was named a Western Conference All-Star reserve. On February 9, in his return to Chicago, Butler scored 38 points in a 114–113 loss to the Bulls. Butler chose to not play in the All-Star Game, prioritizing the stretch run of the season and thought the rest would benefit him. However, in the Timberwolves' first game after the All-Star break, on February 23 against the Houston Rockets, Butler left the game late in the third quarter with a right knee injury. Two days later, he underwent meniscus surgery and was ruled out indefinitely. Butler returned to action on April 6 to score 18 points in a 113–96 win over the Los Angeles Lakers. In Game 3 of the Timberwolves' first-round playoff series against the Rockets, Butler hit four 3-pointers among his 28 points in a 121–105 win. The Timberwolves went on to lose the series in five games.

Shortly before training camp in 2018, Butler requested a trade from the Timberwolves, indicating he would not re-sign with the team in the 2019 off-season. When a trade was not achieved prior to the start of the regular season, Butler opted to play for Minnesota in 2018–19. He appeared in 10 of the Timberwolves' first 13 games before being traded in early November.

Philadelphia 76ers (2018–2019)

On November 12, 2018, Butler was traded, along with Justin Patton, to the Philadelphia 76ers in exchange for Jerryd Bayless, Robert Covington, Dario Šarić and a 2022 second-round draft pick. He made his debut for the 76ers two days later, scoring 14 points in a 111–106 loss to the Orlando Magic. On November 25, he recorded 34 points and 12 rebounds and made a 3-pointer with 2.3 seconds remaining to give the 76ers a 127–125 victory over the Brooklyn Nets. On December 5, he scored a season-high 38 points in a 113–102 loss to the Toronto Raptors. Two days later, he had a second straight 38-point game in a 117–111 win over the Detroit Pistons. On January 29, Butler was shifted to point guard and had 20 points and six assists in a 121–105 win over the Los Angeles Lakers. In Game 1 of the 76ers' first-round playoff series against the Nets, Butler scored a game-high 36 points in a 111–102 loss. In Game 2 of the second round, Butler had 30 points and 11 rebounds to help the 76ers tie the series against the Raptors at 1–1 with a 94–89 win. In Game 6, he scored 25 points in a 112–101 win, helping the 76ers tie series against the Raptors at 3–3. The 76ers went on to lose 92–90 in Game 7 despite Butler's 16 points.

Miami Heat (2019–present)

2019–2021: First Finals appearance and steals leader
On July 6, 2019, Butler signed with the Miami Heat via a sign and trade with the 76ers in a four-team trade. On December 9, Butler was named Eastern Conference Player of the Week after he averaged 27.5 points, 9.0 rebounds and 8.5 assists per game. On December 10, Butler recorded a career-high 18 rebounds, along with 20 points and 11 assists in a 135–121 overtime win against the Atlanta Hawks. On January 30, 2020, Butler was named to his fifth NBA All-Star Game. On February 3, Butler scored a season-high 38 points on 14-of-20 shooting from the field, as the Heat beat his former team, the Philadelphia 76ers 137–106.

On August 31, in Game 1 of the Eastern Conference Semifinals, Butler scored a then playoff career-high 40 points on 13-of-20 shooting from the field in a 115–104 win over the first-seeded Milwaukee Bucks. On September 8, Miami advanced to the next round after Game 5 win, thus completing the upset. The Heat reached the NBA Finals after defeating the Boston Celtics in the Eastern Conference Finals in six games, earning Butler his first Finals appearance. In Game 3 of the 2020 NBA Finals, Butler finished with 40 points, 11 rebounds, and 13 assists and became the third player in Finals history to record a 40+ point triple-double, joining LeBron James (then with Cleveland) in 2015 and Jerry West with the Los Angeles Lakers in 1969. Butler also became the first player to have more points, rebounds and assists in a Finals game than James, who finished with 25 points, 10 rebounds and eight assists. In Game 5, Butler had 35 points, 12 rebounds, 11 assists, and 5 steals to become the first player to register 35+ points, 10+ rebounds, 10+ assists and 5+ steals in a Finals game. He is also the second player to reach such stats in NBA playoff history after Gary Payton in 2000. Butler became the second player with multiple 30-point triple-doubles in the same Finals series, joining James in 2015. He became the sixth player with multiple triple-doubles in a Finals series along with James, Magic Johnson, Larry Bird, Wilt Chamberlain and Draymond Green. The Heat came up short against the Los Angeles Lakers in six games. Butler became only the second player in a Finals series to lead his team in points, rebounds, assists, steals and blocks, joining James in 2016.

On February 11, 2021, Butler recorded his 10th career triple-double with 27 points, 10 rebounds and 10 assists in the Heat's 101–94 win over the Houston Rockets. On February 18, Butler logged his 13th career triple-double with 13 points, 10 rebounds and 13 assists in a 118–110 win over the Sacramento Kings, becoming the first player in franchise history with three consecutive triple-doubles. Together with teammate Bam Adebayo who posted 16 points, 12 rebounds and 10 assists, they became the first pair in league history to register triple-doubles in the same game more than once. Butler finished the regular season leading the league in steals with 2.1 steals per game. In the playoffs, the Heat were eliminated in a four-game sweep by the Milwaukee Bucks who would go on to win the NBA Finals. In Game 4, Butler recorded his third career playoff triple-double.

2021–present: Best Eastern Conference record and Conference Finals
On August 7, 2021, Butler was signed to a reported four-year, $184 million contract extension by the Heat. On December 28, he recorded 25 points, eight rebounds, and a career-high 15 assists in a 119–112 loss to the Washington Wizards. On January 23, 2022, during a matchup against the Los Angeles Lakers and LeBron James, Butler surpassed James for first place on the Heat all-time triple-doubles list. On February 3, Butler was named a reserve for the 2022 NBA All-Star Game, making it his sixth career All-Star selection. On April 7, Butler and Miami clinched the No. 1 seed in the Eastern Conference. On April 17, during Game 1 of the first round of the playoffs, he logged 21 points, six rebounds, four assists and three steals in a 115–91 win over the Atlanta Hawks. Two days later, he posted a then playoff career-high 45 points along with five rebounds, five assists and zero turnovers in a Game 2 115–105 win. Butler became only the third player in franchise history to have at least 45 points, five assists and five rebounds in a postseason game, joining James and Dwyane Wade. He also became the fifth player since 1978 to have at least 45 points and zero turnovers in an NBA playoff game. In Game 4 of the series, on April 24, Butler recorded 36 points, 10 rebounds, four assists, four steals and zero turnovers in a 110–86 win. On May 8, in Game 4 of the Eastern Conference Semifinals, Butler recorded 40 points on 13-of-20 shooting from the field in a 116–108 loss to the Philadelphia 76ers.

On May 17, in Game 1 of the Eastern Conference Finals, Butler posted 41 points (27 in the second half), nine rebounds, five assists, four steals and three blocks in a 118–107 win over the Boston Celtics. He became the first player in NBA postseason history to meet all of those benchmarks since steals and blocks were first recorded in 1974. Butler posted his fifth career playoff game with 40 points on 60 percent shooting, and tied with Charles Barkley for third-most over the last 30 playoffs. The only players that have more such games are James (12) and Shaquille O'Neal (8). Butler also achieved the most 40-point, 5-rebound and 5-assist playoff games in Heat history with three, one more than James and Wade. On May 21, Butler injured his right knee and did not play in the second half of Game 3. Miami would go on to win the game 109–103 and take a 2–1 series lead. In Game 6 of the series, on May 27, Butler scored a playoff career-high 47 points along with nine rebounds, eight assists, and four steals to lead Miami to a 111–103 win and force Game 7. He made 16 of 29 shots, including 4-of-8 from the three-point range and all 11 free throws. Butler's 47 points were the seventh-most in NBA history for a player facing elimination. He also became the first player since Michael Jordan in 1988 to have multiple games of at least 40 points and four steals in the same series. In the decisive Game 7, the Heat were eliminated despite 35 points and nine rebounds from Butler, including 24 points in the first half. With 16 seconds left in the fourth quarter, he missed a three-pointer that would have given the Heat the lead in an eventual 100–96 loss. Butler had his eighth 30-point game of the postseason, making it the most in a single postseason by a Heat player since James in 2013, who also had eight such games.

On November 10, 2022, Butler scored a season-high 35 points, along with 10 rebounds and eight assists in an 117–112 overtime win over the Charlotte Hornets. He scored eight consecutive Heat points at the end of regulation just to get them into the extra session. On December 2, Butler returned to the lineup after missing the previous seven games with a sore right knee. He had a season-high 15 rebounds and 25 points in a 120–116 overtime win over the reigning Eastern Conference champions Boston Celtics.

On January 10, 2023, Butler tied his season-high with 35 points, along with seven rebounds, four assists, four steals and three blocks in an 112–111 win over the Oklahoma City Thunder. He led the way going 23-of-23 from the free throw line, tying Dominique Wilkins for the second-most made free throws without a miss in NBA history. The Heat set an NBA record by making all 40 of their free throws, the last of those coming on Butler’s three-point play with 12.9 seconds left in the game. On February 10, Butler made a game-winning alley-oop dunk in a 97–95 win over the Houston Rockets. On March 11, Butler scored a season-high 38 points, including 15 in the final six minutes of the fourth quarter when Miami overcame a 15-point deficit. His three-pointer at the buzzer of regulation sent the game to overtime, which the Heat lost 126–114 in against the Orlando Magic.

Career statistics

NBA

Regular season

|-
| style="text-align:left;"|
| style="text-align:left;"|Chicago
| 42 || 0 || 8.5 || .405 || .182 || .768 || 1.3 || .3 || .3 || .1 || 2.6
|-
| style="text-align:left;"|
| style="text-align:left;"|Chicago
| style="background:#cfecec;"|82* || 20 || 26.0 || .467 || .381 || .803 || 4.0 || 1.4 || 1.0 || .4 || 8.6
|-
| style="text-align:left;"|
| style="text-align:left;"|Chicago
| 67 || 67 || 38.7 || .397 || .283 || .769 || 4.9 || 2.6 || 1.9 || .5 || 13.1
|-
| style="text-align:left;"|
| style="text-align:left;"|Chicago
| 65 || 65 || style="background:#cfecec;"|38.7* || .462 || .378 || .834 || 5.8 || 3.3 || 1.8 || .6 || 20.0
|-
| style="text-align:left;"|
| style="text-align:left;"|Chicago
| 67 || 67 || 36.9 || .454 || .312 || .832 || 5.3 || 4.8 || 1.6 || .6 || 20.9
|-
| style="text-align:left;"|
| style="text-align:left;"|Chicago
| 76 || 75 || 37.0 || .455 || .367 || .865 || 6.2 || 5.5 || 1.9 || .4 || 23.9
|-
| style="text-align:left;"|
| style="text-align:left;"|Minnesota
| 59 || 59 || 36.7 || .474 || .350 || .854 || 5.3 || 4.9 || 2.0 || .4 || 22.2
|-
| style="text-align:left;"|
| style="text-align:left;"|Minnesota
| 10 || 10 || 36.1 || .471 || .378 || .787 || 5.2 || 4.3 || 2.4 || 1.0 || 21.3
|-
| style="text-align:left;"|
| style="text-align:left;"|Philadelphia
| 55 || 55 || 33.2 || .461 || .338 || .868 || 5.3 || 4.0 || 1.8 || .5 || 18.2
|-
| style="text-align:left;"|
| style="text-align:left;"|Miami
| 58 || 58 || 33.8 || .455 || .244 || .834 || 6.7 || 6.0 || 1.8 || .6 || 19.9
|-
| style="text-align:left;"|
| style="text-align:left;"|Miami
| 52 || 52 || 33.6 || .497 || .245 || .863 || 6.9 || 7.1 || style="background:#cfecec;"|2.1* || .3 || 21.5
|-
| style="text-align:left;"|
| style="text-align:left;"|Miami
| 57 || 57 || 33.9 || .480 || .233 || .870 || 5.9 || 5.5 || 1.6 || .5 || 21.4
|- class="sortbottom"
| style="text-align:center;" colspan="2"|Career
| 690 || 585 || 33.1 || .460 || .321 || .841 || 5.3 || 4.1 || 1.6 || .5 || 17.7
|- class="sortbottom"
| style="text-align:center;" colspan="2"|All-Star
| 4 || 1 || 12.8 || .750 || .000 ||  || 1.8 || 1.5 || 1.8 || .0 || 4.5

Playoffs

|-
| style="text-align:left;"|2012
| style="text-align:left;"|Chicago
| 3 || 0 || 1.3 ||  ||  ||  || .0 || .0 || .0 || .0 || .0
|-
| style="text-align:left;"|2013
| style="text-align:left;"|Chicago
| 12 || 12 || 40.8 || .435 || .405 || .818 || 5.2 || 2.7 || 1.3 || .5 || 13.3
|-
| style="text-align:left;"|2014
| style="text-align:left;"|Chicago
| 5 || 5 || 43.6 || .386 || .300 || .783 || 5.2 || 2.2 || 1.4 || .0 || 13.6
|-
| style="text-align:left;"|2015
| style="text-align:left;"|Chicago
| 12 || 12 || 42.2 || .441 || .389 || .819 || 5.6 || 3.2 || 2.4 || .8 || 22.9
|-
| style="text-align:left;"|2017
| style="text-align:left;"|Chicago
| 6 || 6 || 39.8 || .426 || .261 || .809 || 7.3 || 4.3 || 1.7 || .8 || 22.7
|-
| style="text-align:left;"|2018
| style="text-align:left;"|Minnesota
| 5 || 5 || 34.0 || .444 || .471 || .833 || 6.0 || 4.0 || .8 || .2 || 15.8
|-
| style="text-align:left;"|2019
| style="text-align:left;"|Philadelphia
|| 12 || 12 || 35.1 || .451 || .267 || .875 || 6.1 || 5.2 || 1.4 || .6 || 19.4
|-
| style="text-align:left;"|2020
| style="text-align:left;"|Miami
| 21 || 21 || 38.4 || .488 || .349 || .859 || 6.5 || 6.0 || 2.0 || .7 || 22.2
|-
| style="text-align:left;"|2021
| style="text-align:left;"|Miami
| 4 || 4 || 38.5 || .297 || .267 || .727 || 7.5 || 7.0 || 1.3 || .3 || 14.5
|-
| style="text-align:left;"|2022
| style="text-align:left;"|Miami
| 17 || 17 || 37.0 || .506 || .338 || .841 || 7.4 || 4.6 || 2.1 || .6 || 27.4
|- class="sortbottom"
| style="text-align:center;" colspan="2"|Career
| 97 || 94 || 37.5 || .457 ||.344 || .837 || 6.1 || 4.4 || 1.7 || .6 || 20.0

College

|-
| style="text-align:left;"|2008–09
| style="text-align:left;"|Marquette
| 35 || 0 || 19.6 || .514 || .000 || .768 || 3.9 || .7 || .5 || .5 || 5.6
|-
| style="text-align:left;"|2009–10
| style="text-align:left;"|Marquette
| 34 || 34 || 34.3 || .530 || .500 || .766 || 6.4 || 2.0 || 1.3 || .6 || 14.7
|-
| style="text-align:left;"|2010–11
| style="text-align:left;"|Marquette
| 37 || 35 || 34.6 || .490 || .345 || .783 || 6.1 || 2.3 || 1.4 || .4 || 15.7
|- class="sortbottom"
| style="text-align:center;" colspan="2"|Career
| 106 || 69 || 29.6 || .508 || .383 || .773 || 5.5 || 1.7 || 1.1 || .5 || 12.0

Personal life
While attending Marquette, Butler earned a Bachelor of Arts degree in communications.

Butler is a fan of country music and was featured in the music video of the country song "Light It Up" by Luke Bryan. He is good friends with Mark Wahlberg, whom he met while Wahlberg was filming Transformers: Age of Extinction in Chicago. The two have vacationed in Paris together.

Butler became a fan of soccer during the 2016 Summer Olympics, after watching Neymar Jr. play for Brazil. He cites Paris Saint Germain as his favourite team and Neymar as his favourite player.

Butler and his girlfriend have a daughter. He missed the first three games of the 2019–20 NBA season due to the birth of his daughter.

In the NBA Bubble, Butler opened his own coffee shop, which he operated out of his hotel room using his French press coffee brewer, charging $20 per cup. A year later, he officially launched his coffee brand, and planned to dedicate his time into the coffee roastery business post-retirement.

References

External links

 Marquette Golden Eagles bio
 

1989 births
Living people
African-American basketball players
American men's basketball players
Basketball players at the 2016 Summer Olympics
Basketball players from Houston
Chicago Bulls draft picks
Chicago Bulls players
Marquette Golden Eagles men's basketball players
Medalists at the 2016 Summer Olympics
Miami Heat players
Minnesota Timberwolves players
National Basketball Association All-Stars
Olympic gold medalists for the United States in basketball
People from Tomball, Texas
Philadelphia 76ers players
Shooting guards
Small forwards
Tyler Apaches men's basketball players
United States men's national basketball team players
21st-century African-American sportspeople
20th-century African-American people